The chronological order in which countries enter in the new year is determined by the time zone of that particular country or region. The headers display the time (in UTC) and timezone.

December 31, at 10:00 UTC (UTC+14:00)
These locations are the first in the world to receive the new year.

Kiribati
Line Islands

December 31, at 10:15 UTC (UTC+13:45)
New Zealand
Chatham Islands

December 31, at 11:00 UTC (UTC+13:00)
Fiji
Kiribati
Phoenix Islands
New Zealand (with Auckland)
Tokelau
Samoa (since September 21, 2021)
Tonga

December 31, at 12:00 UTC (UTC+12:00)
Australia
Norfolk Island
France
Wallis and Futuna
Kiribati
Gilbert Islands
Marshall Islands
Nauru
Russia
Chukotka Autonomous Okrug
Kamchatka Krai
Tuvalu
United States
Wake Island

December 31, at 13:00 UTC (UTC+11:00)
Australia
Australian Capital Territory
Lord Howe Island
New South Wales (except Broken Hill)
Tasmania
Victoria
Federated States of Micronesia
Kosrae State
Pohnpei State
France
New Caledonia
Papua New Guinea
Autonomous Region of Bougainville
Russia
Magadan Oblast
Sakha Republic
Abyysky District
Allaikhovsky District
Momsky District
Nizhnekolymsky District
Srednekolymsky District
Verkhnekolymsky District
Sakhalin Oblast 
Solomon Islands
Vanuatu

December 31, at 13:30 UTC (UTC+10:30)
Australia
New South Wales
Broken Hill
South Australia

December 31, at 14:00 UTC (UTC+10:00)
Australia
Queensland
Federated States of Micronesia
Chuuk State
Yap State
Papua New Guinea
All country except Autonomous Region of Bougainville
Russia
Primorsky Krai
Jewish Autonomous Oblast
Khabarovsk Krai
Sakha Republic
Oymyakonsky District
Ust-Yansky District
Verkhoyansky District
United States
Guam
Northern Mariana Islands

December 31, at 14:30 UTC (UTC+09:30)
Australia
Northern Territory

December 31, at 15:00 UTC (UTC+09:00)
Indonesia
Moluccas
Papua
Japan
North Korea (since May 5, 2018)
South Korea
Palau
Russia
Amur Oblast
Sakha Republic
Aldansky District
Amginsky District
Anabarsky District
Bulunsky District (as well as New Siberian Islands)
Churapchinsky District
Eveno-Bytantaysky District
Gorny District
Khangalassky District
Kobyaysky District
Lensky District
Megino-Kangalassky District
Mirninsky District
Namsky District
Neryungrinsky District
Nyurbinsky District
Olyokminsky District
Olenyoksky District
Suntarsky District
Tattinsky District
Tomponsky District
Ust-Aldansky District
Ust-Maysky District
Verkhnevilyuysky District
Vilyuysky District
Yakutsk
Zhigansky District
Zabaykalsky Krai
Timor-Leste

December 31, at 15:15 UTC (UTC+08:45)
Australia
Western Australia
Caiguna, Eucla and Border Village (Far southeastern part of state)

December 31, at 16:00 UTC (UTC+08:00)
This time zone is the area where most people go to the same time in the new year.

Australia
Western Australia
Brunei
People's Republic of China
Hong Kong
Indonesia
East, North, and South Kalimantan
Lesser Sunda Islands
Sulawesi
Macau
Malaysia
Mongolia
Bayankhongor
Arkhangai
Orkhon
Bulgan
Ovorkhangai
Omnogovi
Dornogovi
Khövsgöl
Dundgovi
Tov
Darkhan-Uul
Ulan Bator
Selenge
Khentii
Dornod
Sükhbaatar
Govisumber
Philippines
Russia
Republic of Buryatia
Irkutsk Oblast
Singapore
Taiwan Area of the Republic of China

December 31, at 17:00 UTC (UTC+07:00)
Cambodia
Australia
Christmas Island
Indonesia
Sumatra
Java
West and Central Kalimantan
Laos
Mongolia
Khovd
Uvs
Bayan-Ölgii
Zavkhan
Govi-Altai
Russia
Altai Krai 
Altai Republic 
Republic of Khakassia
Krasnoyarsk Krai
Kemerovo Oblast
Novosibirsk Oblast 
Tomsk Oblast 
Tuva Republic
Thailand
Vietnam

December 31, at 17:30 UTC (UTC+06:30)
Australia
Cocos Islands
Myanmar

December 31, at 18:00 UTC (UTC+06:00)
Bangladesh
Bhutan
Kazakhstan
Almaty
Akmola or Astana
East Kazakhstan Province
Karaganda
Kostanay
North Kazakhstan Province
Pavlodar
South Kazakhstan Province
Jambyl Province
Kyrgyzstan
Russia
Omsk Oblast
United Kingdom
British Indian Ocean Territory (including Chagos Archipelago and Diego Garcia)

December 31, at 18:15 UTC (UTC+05:45)
Nepal

December 31, at 18:30 UTC (UTC+05:30)
In this zone, it is estimated that half the world population, has already entered the new year.

India (including the Andaman and Nicobar Islands and Lakshadweep)
Sri Lanka

December 31, at 19:00 UTC (UTC+05:00)
France
French Southern Territories
Île Amsterdam
Île Saint-Paul
Îles Kerguelen
Australia
Heard Island and McDonald Islands
Kazakhstan
Aktobe
Atyrau
Kyzylorda
Mangystau Province
West Kazakhstan Province
Maldives
Pakistan
Russia 
Republic of Bashkortostan
Chelyabinsk Oblast
Khanty–Mansi Autonomous Okrug
Kurgan Oblast
Orenburg Oblast
Perm Krai
Sverdlovsk Oblast
Tyumen Oblast
Yamalo-Nenets Autonomous Okrugs)
Tajikistan
Turkmenistan
Uzbekistan

December 31, at 19:30 UTC (UTC+04:30)
Afghanistan

December 31, at 20:00 UTC (UTC+04:00)
Armenia
Azerbaijan
France
French Southern Territories
Îles Crozet
Réunion
Georgia
Except Abkhazia and South Ossetia
Mauritius
Oman
Russia
Astrakhan Oblast 
Samara Oblast
Saratov Oblast 
Udmurt Republic
Ulyanovsk Oblast 
Scattered islands in the Indian Ocean
Glorioso Islands
Tromelin Island
Seychelles
United Arab Emirates

December 31, at 20:30 UTC (UTC+03:30)
Iran

December 31, at 21:00 UTC (UTC+03:00)
Bahrain
Belarus
Comoros
Djibouti
Eritrea
Ethiopia
France
Mayotte
Georgia
Abkhazia and South Ossetia
Iraq
Kenya
Kuwait
Madagascar
Qatar
Russia
Arkhangelsk Oblast
Belgorod Oblast
Bryansk Oblast
Chechen Republic
Chuvash Republic
Ivanovo Oblast
Kabardino-Balkar Republic
Kalmykia
Kaluga Oblast
Karachay–Cherkess Republic
Kirov Oblast
Komi Republic
Kostroma Oblast
Krasnodar Krai
Kursk Oblast
Leningrad Oblast
Lipetsk Oblast
Mari El Republic
Moscow Oblast
Moscow
Murmansk Oblast
Nenets Autonomous Okrug
Nizhny Novgorod Oblast
Novgorod Oblast
Oryol Oblast
Penza Oblast
Pskov Oblast
Republic of Adygea
Republic of Crimea
Republic of Dagestan
Republic of Ingushetia
Republic of Karelia
Republic of Mordovia
Republic of North Ossetia–Alania
Republic of Tatarstan
Rostov Oblast
Ryazan Oblast
Saint Petersburg
Smolensk Oblast
Stavropol Krai
Tambov Oblast
Tula Oblast
Tver Oblast
Vladimir Oblast
Volgograd Oblast (since December 27, 2020)
Vologda Oblast
Voronezh Oblast
Yaroslavl Oblast
Saudi Arabia
Scattered islands in the Indian Ocean
Bassas da India
Europa Island
Juan de Nova Island
Somalia
South Africa
Prince Edward Islands
Tanzania
Turkey
Uganda
Ukraine
Donetsk and Luhansk popular republics
Yemen

December 31, at 22:00 UTC (UTC+02:00)
Botswana
Bulgaria
Burundi
Cyprus (Northern Cyprus back to UTC+02:00 on October 29, 2017)
Congo, Democratic Republic of the
Kasaï Occidental
Kasaï Oriental
Katanga
Maniema
Nord-Kivu
Orientale Province
Sud-Kivu
Egypt
Estonia
Finland
Greece
Israel
Jordan
Latvia
Lebanon
Lesotho
Libya
Lithuania
Malawi
Moldova
Mozambique
Namibia
Palestine
Romania
Russia
Kaliningrad Oblast
Rwanda
South Africa
South Sudan (since February 1, 2021)
Sudan 
Swaziland
Syria
Ukraine
Except Donetsk and Luhansk popular republics 
United Kingdom
Akrotiri and Dhekelia
Zambia
Zimbabwe

December 31, at 23:00 UTC (UTC+01:00)
Albania
Algeria
Andorra
Angola
Austria
Belgium
Benin
Bosnia and Herzegovina
Cameroon
Central African Republic
Chad
Croatia
Czech Republic
Democratic Republic of the Congo
Équateur
Kasai-Occidental
Kasai-Oriental
Kinshasa
Bas-Congo
Bandundu
Denmark
Equatorial Guinea
France
Gabon
Germany
Hungary
Italy
Kosovo
Liechtenstein
Luxembourg
Malta
Monaco
Montenegro
Morocco
Netherlands
Niger
Nigeria
North Macedonia
Norway (Including Svalbard and Jan Mayen and Bouvet Island)
Poland
Republic of the Congo
San Marino
Serbia
Slovakia
Slovenia
Spain (Including Balearic Islands, Ceuta and Melilla and excluding Canary Islands)
Sweden
Switzerland
Tunisia
United Kingdom
Gibraltar
Vatican City
Western Sahara

January 1, at 00:00 UTC (UTC+00:00)
Burkina Faso
Côte d'Ivoire
Denmark
Faroe Islands
Gambia
Ghana
Greenland
Danmarkshavn and surrounding area
Guinea
Guinea-Bissau
Iceland
Liberia
Mali
Mauritania
Portugal (Including Madeira and excluding Azores islands)
Ireland
São Tomé and Príncipe (Since January 1, 2019)
Senegal
Sierra Leone
Spain
Canary Islands
Togo
United Kingdom (Including Guernsey, Isle of Man, Jersey and Saint Helena, Ascension and Tristan da Cunha)

January 1, at 01:00 UTC (UTC−01:00)
Cape Verde
Greenland
Ittoqqortoormiit
Portugal
Azores islands

January 1, at 02:00 UTC (UTC−02:00)
Brazil
Fernando de Noronha
Trindade and Martim Vaz islands
United Kingdom
South Georgia and the South Sandwich Islands

January 1, at 03:00 UTC (UTC−03:00)
Argentina
Brazil
Alagoas
Amapá
Bahia
Ceará
Distrito Federal
Espírito Santo
Goias
Maranhão
Minas Gerais
Pará
Paraíba
Paraná
Pernambuco
Piauí
Rio de Janeiro
Rio Grande do Norte
Rio Grande do Sul
Santa Catarina
São Paulo
Sergipe
Tocantins
Chile
France
French Guiana
Saint-Pierre and Miquelon
Greenland
All Greenland except Thule Air Base area, Danmarkshavn area and Ittoqqortoormiit area
Paraguay
Suriname
United Kingdom
Falkland Islands
Uruguay (Stopped DST on 30 June 2015)

January 1, at 03:30 UTC (UTC−03:30)
Canada
Newfoundland and Labrador
Labrador
Southeastern area
Newfoundland

January 1, at 04:00 UTC (UTC−04:00)
Antigua and Barbuda
Barbados
Bolivia
Brazil
Amazonas (Except westernmost municipalities)
Mato Grosso
Mato Grosso do Sul
Rondônia
Roraima
Canada
New Brunswick
Newfoundland and Labrador
Labrador
All Labrador except southeastern area
Nova Scotia
Prince Edward Island
Quebec
East of the 63°W longitude
Dominica
Dominican Republic
France
Guadeloupe
Martinique
Saint Barthélemy
Saint-Martin
Greenland
Thule Air Base
Grenada
Guyana
Netherlands
Aruba
Bonaire
Curaçao
Saba
Sint Eustatius
Sint Maarten
Saint Kitts and Nevis
Saint Lucia
Saint Vincent and the Grenadines
Trinidad and Tobago
United Kingdom
Anguilla
Bermuda
Montserrat
British Virgin Islands
Turks and Caicos Islands
United States
U.S. Virgin Islands
Puerto Rico
Venezuela

January 1, at 05:00 UTC (UTC−05:00)
Bahamas
Brazil
Acre
Amazonas (Westernmost municipalities)
Canada
Nunavut
Qikiqtaaluk Region (except Resolute)
Ontario
East of 90° West except Big Trout Lake area
Atikokan area
New Osnaburgh and Pickle Lake area
Upsala (West of 90° West)
Quebec
Most of province except easternmost area
Chile
Easter Island
Colombia
Cuba
Ecuador
Haiti
Jamaica
Mexico
Quintana Roo
Panama
Peru
United Kingdom
Cayman Islands
United States
Alabama
Phenix City
Connecticut
Delaware
District of Columbia
Florida
East of the Apalachicola River
Georgia
Indiana
All state except northwest counties and southwest counties
Kentucky
Eastern half
Maine
Maryland
Massachusetts
Michigan
All state except counties bordering Wisconsin
Navassa Island
New Hampshire
New Jersey
New York
North Carolina
Ohio
Pennsylvania
Rhode Island
South Carolina
Tennessee
East Tennessee
Vermont
Virginia
West Virginia

January 1, at 06:00 UTC (UTC−06:00)
Belize
Canada
Manitoba
Nunavut
Kivalliq Region except Southampton Island
Ontario
Northwestern Ontario (West of 90° West)
Saskatchewan
 All province except Lloydminster and surrounding area
Costa Rica
Ecuador
Galápagos Islands
El Salvador
Guatemala
Honduras
Mexico
Aguascalientes
Campeche
Coahuila
Colima
Chiapas
Ciudad de México
Durango
Guanajuato
Guerrero
Hidalgo
Jalisco
State of México
Michoacán
Morelos
Nayarit
Bahía de Banderas
Nuevo León
Oaxaca
Puebla
Querétaro
San Luis Potosí
Tabasco
Tamaulipas
Tlaxcala
Veracruz
Yucatán
Zacatecas
Nicaragua
United States
Alabama
All state except Phenix City
Arkansas
Florida
West of the Apalachicola River
Illinois
Indiana
Northwestern
Jasper County
Lake County
LaPorte County
Newton County
Porter County
Starke County
Southwestern
Gibson County
Perry County
Posey County
Spencer County
Vanderburgh County
Warrick County
Iowa
Kansas
All state except westernmost counties
Kentucky
Western half
Louisiana
Michigan
Counties bordering Wisconsin
Dickinson County
Gogebic County
Iron County
Menominee County
Minnesota
Mississippi
Missouri
Nebraska
Central and eastern Nebraska
North Dakota
All state except southwest
Oklahoma
All state except Kenton
South Dakota
Eastern half
Tennessee
Middle Tennessee
West Tennessee
Bledsoe County
Cumberland County
Marion County
Sequatchie County
Texas
All state except westernmost counties
Wisconsin

January 1, at 07:00 UTC (UTC−07:00)
Canada
Alberta
British Columbia
Northeastern
Northern Rockies Regional District
Peace River Regional District
Southeastern
Regional District of East Kootenay
Regional District of Central Kootenay
Columbia-Shuswap Regional District
Northwest Territories
All territory except Tungsten, Northwest Territories and the associated Cantung Mine
Nunavut
Most of Kitikmeot Region
Saskatchewan
Lloydminster and surrounding area
Yukon (since March 8, 2020)
Mexico
Baja California Sur
Colima
Revillagigedo Islands
Roca Partida Island
San Benedicto
Socorro Island
Chihuahua
Nayarit (except Bahía de Banderas municipality)
Sinaloa
Sonora
United States
Arizona
Colorado
Idaho
South of the Salmon River
East of the Idaho County/Lemhi County border (between the Salmon River and the Montana state border)
Kansas
Greeley County
Hamilton County
Sherman County
Wallace County
Montana
Nebraska
Western Nebraska (Panhandle)
Nevada
Duck Valley Indian Reservation
Jackpot
West Wendover
New Mexico
North Dakota
Southwestern
Oklahoma
Kenton
Oregon
Northern  of Malheur County
South Dakota
Western half
Texas
El Paso County
Hudspeth County
Northwestern Culberson County
Utah
Wyoming

January 1, at 08:00 UTC (UTC−08:00)
Canada
British Columbia
Most of province instead of areas at northeast and southeast
Northwest Territories
Tungsten, Northwest Territories and the associated Cantung Mine
France
Clipperton Island
Mexico
Baja California
Colima
Revillagigedo Islands
Clarion Island
United Kingdom
Pitcairn Islands
United States
California
Idaho
North of the Salmon River
West of the Idaho County/Lemhi County border
Nevada
Most of state, except Idaho border towns and West Wendover
Oregon
All state except Ontario and the northern 4/5 of Malheur County
Washington

January 1, at 09:00 UTC (UTC−09:00)
France
French Polynesia
Gambier Islands
United States
Alaska
Mainland Alaska and Aleutian Islands east of 169°30′ West

January 1, at 09:30 UTC (UTC−09:30)
France
French Polynesia
Marquesas Islands

January 1, at 10:00 UTC (UTC−10:00)
France
French Polynesia
Society Archipelago including Tahiti
Tuamotu Archipelago
Tubuai Islands
New Zealand
Cook Islands
United States
Alaska
Aleutian Islands (West of 169°30′ West)
Hawaii
Including Kure Atoll, Pearl and Hermes Reef and the rest of the uninhabited Northwestern Hawaiian Islands, excluding Midway Atoll)
United States Minor Outlying Islands
Johnston Atoll

January 1, at 11:00 UTC (UTC−11:00)
These locations are the last inhabited locations in the world to receive the new year.

United States
American Samoa
United States Minor Outlying Islands
Jarvis Island
Kingman Reef
Midway Atoll
Palmyra Atoll
New Zealand
Niue

January 1, at 12:00 UTC (UTC−12:00)
These locations are (unofficially) the last in the world to receive the new year.

United States
United States Minor Outlying Islands
Baker Island
Howland Island

References

External links
 Timeanddate.com

New Year celebrations